Ipomoea littoralis is a trailing herb or sometimes twining that is found tropical sea line area of Asia. The flower is beautiful and bright pink. In Bangladesh, it is found in Saint Martin's Island and along the Takanaf coastline of Cox's Bazar. The funnel-shaped, pink, or pinkish-purple flowers attract the insect. It is a rare wild morning flory in Bangladesh.

References

littoralis